The San Gabriel Pastoral Region is a pastoral region of the Archdiocese of Los Angeles in the Roman Catholic Church. It covers East Los Angeles through the San Gabriel and Pomona valleys.  The region has 67 parishes, 13 high schools, many elementary schools, no hospitals, 2 cemeteries, and 1 Spanish Mission.  The Episcopal Vicariate is currently vacant, following the death of Bishop David G. O'Connell in 2023.

Parishes

Deanery 9 (East LA, Boyle Heights, City Terrace)

Deanery 10 (Pasadena, Altadena, San Gabriel, Monterey Park, Montebello, Alhambra)

Deanery 11 (Arcadia, Covina, Glendora, Monrovia, El Monte)

Deanery 12 (San Dimas, Claremont, Pomona, Diamond Bar, La Puente, Valinda, Walnut)

Spanish Missions

Universities or Colleges
There are no Catholic universities or colleges in the region.

High schools

Elementary schools
All Souls, Alhambra
Ramona Convent, Alhambra
St. Therese, Alhambra
St. Thomas More, Alhambra
St. Elizabeth, Altadena
Annunciation, Arcadia
Holy Angels, Arcadia
St. Frances of Rome, Azusa
St. John the Baptist, Baldwin Park
Our Lady of the Assumption, Claremont
Sacred Heart, Covina
St. Louise de Marillac, Covina
Nativity, El Monte
St. Dorothy, Glendora
St. Joseph, La Puente
St. Louis of France, La Puente
St. Martha, La Puente
All Saints, Los Angeles
Assumption, Los Angeles
Dolores Mission, Los Angeles
Our Lady Help of Christians, Los Angeles
Our Lady of Guadalupe, 436 N. Hazard Ave., Los Angeles
Our Lady of Guadalupe, 4522 Browne Ave., Los Angeles
Our Lady of Lourdes, Los Angeles
Our Lady of Soledad, Los Angeles
Our Lady of Talpa, Los Angeles
Resurrection, Los Angeles
Sacred Heart, Los Angeles
San Antonio de Padua, Los Angeles
Santa Isabel, Los Angeles
Santa Teresita, Los Angeles
St. Alphonsus, Los Angeles
St. Mary, Los Angeles
Immaculate Conception, Monrovia
Our Lady of the Miraculous Medal, Montebello
St. Benedict, Montebello
St. Stephen, Monterey Park
St. Thomas Aquinas, Monterey Park
Armenian Sisters Academy, Montrose
Assumption of the BVM, Pasadena
Mayfield Junior School, Pasadena
St. Andrew, Pasadena
St. Philip the Apostle, Pasadena
St. Joseph, Pomona
St. Madeleine, Pomona
Holy Name of Mary, San Dimas
San Gabriel Mission, San Gabriel
St. Anthony, San Gabriel
SS. Felicitas & Perpetua, San Marino
St. Rita, Sierra Madre
Epiphany, So. El Monte
Holy Family, So. Pasadena
St. Luke, Temple City
St. Christopher, West Covina

Hospitals
There are no Catholic hospitals in the region.  It does contain Santa Teresita, a Carmelite ministry that began as a tuberculosis sanitorium in 1930, opened as a hospital in 1955, and re-opened as an assisted living facility in 2004 in the wake of various troubles.

Cemeteries
Calvary Cemetery, East Los Angeles
Holy Cross Cemetery, Pomona
Queen of Heaven Cemetery, Rowland Heights
Resurrection Cemetery, Monterey Park

See also
Roman Catholic Archdiocese of Los Angeles
Our Lady of the Angels Pastoral Region
San Fernando Pastoral Region
San Pedro Pastoral Region
Santa Barbara Pastoral Region
List of schools in the Roman Catholic Archdiocese of Los Angeles

References

External links
official website
Archdiocese of Los Angeles: Office of Religious Education: San Gabriel Pastoral Region
World News: San Gabriel Pastoral Region

Los Angeles San Gabriel
Roman Catholic Archdiocese of Los Angeles